Greatest Hits is the first compilation album by American country music singer Gretchen Wilson. It was released on January 19, 2010 via Columbia Nashville. The album features all of Wilson's top 40 hits and a live cover of Heart's 1977 hit "Barracuda."  The album's release was announced after Wilson had parted ways with Columbia Nashville in mid-2009 to begin her own record label, Redneck Records.

Track listing

Chart performance

References

2010 greatest hits albums
Gretchen Wilson albums
Albums produced by John Rich
Columbia Records compilation albums